Grigori Markovich Pinaichev (born 22 January 1913 in Moscow; died 26 July 1988 in Moscow) was a Soviet Russian football player and coach.

External links
 

1913 births
Footballers from Moscow
1988 deaths
Soviet footballers
PFC CSKA Moscow players
Soviet football managers
PFC CSKA Moscow managers
Soviet expatriate football managers
Expatriate football managers in Bulgaria
FC SKA Rostov-on-Don managers
Association football defenders